The St. Paul University Manila, also referred to by its acronym SPUM or SPU Manila, is a private, Catholic coeducational basic and higher education institution established and run by the Congregation of the Sisters of Saint Paul of Chartres in Dumaguete City, Philippines. It was established in 1912 by the Sisters of St. Paul of Chartres (SPC), a religious congregation founded in Chartres, France in 1698. It was previously an all-girls' school and turned co-ed beginning school year 2005-2006.

On 1912, St. Paul's Manila opened a Kindergarten school with an enrollment of six girls, upon request of the families in the neighborhood.The school was named St. Paul Institution. Grade I was opened in 1913 with one higher grade opened each year and boys accepted up to Grade 2. The Grade School Department was given government recognition when it has reached Grade 6.

Notable alumni
Charo Santos-Concio - (Communication Arts Batch 1977, Cum Laude) - Former President of ABS-CBN Corporation and host of the country's longest-running drama anthology Maalaala Mo Kaya.
Malu Maglutac - (HS Batch) - TV host, Ballerina, and Model.
Ameurfina Melencio-Herrera (HS Batch 1938) - Associate Justice of the Philippine Supreme Court from 1979 to 1992.
Pilita Corrales - Singer 
June Keithley - (Nursing Batch 1966) - Actress and Radio broadcaster.
Lovely Rivero - Actress
Anna Larrucea - Actress
Lorraine Schuck - (Business Management Batch 1980) - Mutya ng Pilipinas title holder
Janet Basco - Singer
Celeste Legaspi - (HS Batch 1966) - Singer
Edu Manzano - Actor, TV host, and Politician
Maniya Barredo - (HS Batch 1969) - Ballet dancer
 Agnes Devanadera - (Commerce Batch 1970) - 41st Solicitor General of the Philippines from 2007 to 2010.
 Estela Perlas-Bernabe - (Commerce Batch 1972, Magna Cum Laude) - Associate Justice of the Philippine Supreme Court from 2011 to 2022.

See also
St. Paul University Philippines, Tuguegarao City
St. Paul University Quezon City, Metro Manila
St. Paul University Dumaguete, Negros Oriental
St. Paul University Iloilo, Iloilo City
St. Paul University Surigao, Surigao del Norte

References

External links

 
 The Paulinian, official student publication of SPU Manila

Catholic universities and colleges in Manila
Education in Malate, Manila
Educational institutions established in 1911
Universities and colleges in Manila
1911 establishments in the Philippines